The Moluccan swiftlets (Aerodramus infuscatus) is a swift in the family Apodidae.
They are endemic to Indonesia.  They were at one time considered conspecific.

The three subspecies are:

Sulawesi swiftlet,  Aerodramus i. sororum 
Halmahera swiftlet,  Aerodramus i. infuscatus
Seram swiftlet,  Aerodramus i. ceramensis

Their natural habitat is subtropical or tropical moist lowland forests and subtropical or tropical moist montane forests.

References
 BirdLife International 2004.  Aerodramus infuscatus.  2006 IUCN Red List of Threatened Species.   Downloaded on 24 July 2007.
Rheindt, F.E., and R.O. Hutchinson. 2007. A photoshot odyssey through the confused avian taxonomy of Seram and Buru (southern Moluccas). BirdingASIA 7: 18–38.

Aerodramus
Taxonomy articles created by Polbot